Rafael Nadal defeated Guillermo Coria in the final, 6–4, 3–6, 6–3, 4–6, 7–6(8–6) to win the men's singles title at the 2005 Italian Open. Nadal was making his tournament debut.

Carlos Moyá was the defending champion, but lost in the first round to Potito Starace.

Seeds
A champion seed is indicated in bold text while text in italics indicates the round in which that seed was eliminated.

  Andy Roddick (third round)
  Marat Safin (second round)
  Gastón Gaudio (third round)
  Tim Henman (third round)
  Rafael Nadal (champion)
  Andre Agassi (semifinals)
  Carlos Moyà (first round)
  David Nalbandian (first round)
  Guillermo Coria (final)
  Joachim Johansson (first round)
  Guillermo Cañas (third round)
  Ivan Ljubičić (third round)
  Tommy Robredo (first round)
  Nikolay Davydenko (first round)
  Radek Štěpánek (quarterfinals)
  Thomas Johansson (second round)

Draw

Finals

Top half

Section 1

Section 2

Bottom half

Section 3

Section 4

External links
 2005 Internazionali BNL d'Italia Singles draw
 2005 Internazionali BNL d'Italia Qualifying draw

Men's Singles
Italian Open – Singles